National Route 29 is a national highway in South Korea connects Boseong to Seosan. It established on 14 March 1981.

Main stopovers
South Jeolla Province
 Boseong County - Hwasun County
Gwangju
 Dong District - Buk District
South Jeolla Province
 Damyang County
North Jeolla Province
 Sunchang County - Jeongeup - Buan County - Gimje - Jeongeup - Gimje - Gunsan
South Chungcheong Province
 Seocheon County - Buyeo County - Cheongyang County - Yesan County - Hongseong County - Seosan

Major intersections

 (■): Motorway
IS: Intersection, IC: Interchange

South Jeolla Province

North Jeolla Province

South Chungcheong Province

References

29
Roads in South Jeolla
Roads in Gwangju
Roads in North Jeolla
Roads in South Chungcheong